Alvin Williams (born January 17, 1965) is a former American football player who played five seasons in the Arena Football League with the New England Steamrollers, Pittsburgh Gladiators, Denver Dynamite, New Orleans Night and Sacramento Attack. He played college football at Texas Southern University.

References

External links
Just Sports Stats

Living people
1965 births
Players of American football from Houston
American football wide receivers
American football defensive backs
African-American players of American football
Texas Southern Tigers football players
New England Steamrollers players
Pittsburgh Gladiators players
Denver Dynamite (arena football) players
New Orleans Night players
Sacramento Attack players
21st-century African-American people
20th-century African-American sportspeople